Seckel Isaac Fränkel (1765–1835) was a German-Jewish communal activist and scholar. In 1818, when the new Hamburg Temple was formally inaugurated, Fränkel, with Meyer Israel Bresselau, published a new prayer book for the Temple, considered the first Reform liturgy.

He was also translated most of the Jewish apocrypha from Greek into Hebrew (1830).

Works
 כתובים אחרונים ("Later Scriptures") Ketuvim aḥaronim: ha-noda`im be-shem Apoḳrifa asher lo nod`u... (Latin: Hagiographa posteriora: denominata Apocrypha, hactenus Israelitis ignota, nunc autem e textu Gracco in linguam Hebraicam convertit atque in lucem emisit Seckel Isaac Fraenkel), Leipzig, 1830

Further reading

References

1765 births
1835 deaths
German Reform rabbis
Bible translators
Translators of Ancient Greek texts
Translators to Hebrew